Kota Yamamura (山村宏太 Yamamura Kota, born October 20, 1980) is a retired Japanese national volleyball player and used to play for Suntory Sunbirds on club level. He is currently active as Sunbirds' head coach.

He used to be the captain for the Japan men's national volleyball team in 2013.

Club
  Kinjo High School
  University of Tsukuba
  Suntory Sunbirds (2003–2014)

Awards

Individuals
 2007-08 Men's V.Premier League – "Best 6"
 2008-09 Men's V.Premier League – "Best Spike" and "Best 6"
 2013 62nd Kurowashi Tournament  – "Best 6"

Team
 2003-04 V.League –  Champion, with Suntory Sunbirds.
 2004-05 V.League – 5th place, with Suntory Sunbirds.
 2005-06 V.League –  Runner-Up, with Suntory Sunbirds.
 2006-07 V.Premier League –  Champion, with Suntory Sunbirds.
 2007-08 V.Premier League –  3rd place, with Suntory Sunbirds
 2008-09 V.Premier League – 4th place, with Suntory Sunbirds.
 2009-10 V.Premier League – 5th place, with Suntory Sunbirds.
 2010-11 V.Premier League –  Runner-Up, with Suntory Sunbirds.
 2011-12 V.Premier League –  3rd place, with Suntory Sunbirds.
 2012-13 V.Premier League – 4th place, with Suntory Sunbirds.
 2013 Kurowashiki All Japan Volleyball Championship –  Champion, with Suntory Sunbirds.
 2013-14 V.Premier League – 6th place, with Suntory Sunbirds.
 2014 Kurowashiki All Japan Volleyball Championship –  3rd place, with Suntory Sunbirds.

National team

Senior Team
 2002 World League – 13th place
 2002 Asian Games –  Bronze Medal
 2003 World League – 13th place
 2005 World Grand Champions Cup – 4th place
 2005 World League – 10th place
 2005 Asian Championship –  Gold Medal
 2006 World Championship – 8th place
 2006 Asian Games – 5th place
 2006 World League – 13th place
 2007 World Cup – 9th place
 2007 World League – 13th place
 2007 Asian Championship –  Silver medal
 2008 Summer Olympics – 11th place
 2008 World League – 6th place
 2009 World Grand Champions Cup –  Bronze Medal
 2009 World League – 15th place
 2010 World Championship – 8th place
 2010 Asian Games –   Gold Medal
 2011 World Cup – 10th place
 2011 World League – 10th place
 2011 Asian Championship – 5th place
 2012 World League – 15th place
 2013 World Grand Champions Cup – 6th place
 2013 World League – 18th place
 2013 Asian Championship – 4th place

References

External links
 V-League official profile
 Suntory Sunbirds Player Profile

1980 births
Living people
Japanese men's volleyball players
People from Higashimurayama, Tokyo
Olympic volleyball players of Japan
Volleyball players at the 2008 Summer Olympics
Asian Games medalists in volleyball
Volleyball players at the 2002 Asian Games
Volleyball players at the 2006 Asian Games
Volleyball players at the 2010 Asian Games
Asian Games gold medalists for Japan
Asian Games bronze medalists for Japan
Medalists at the 2002 Asian Games
Medalists at the 2010 Asian Games